San Geronimo or San Gerónimo may refer to:

Places

Argentina
 San Gerónimo, San Luis, a village in central Argentina

Bolivia
 San Geronimo River

Chile
 San Gerónimo Aerodrome, an airport near Algarrobo, Valparaiso

Dominican Republic
 San Gerónimo (Distrito Nacional), a sector in the city of Santo Domingo

United States
 San Geronimo Creek, a creek in northern California
 San Geronimo Valley, a valley in northern California
 San Geronimo, California, an unincorporated community north of San Francisco
 Fortín de San Gerónimo, a fort in San Juan, Puerto Rico
 Rancho San Geronimo (Cacho), a Mexican land grant in present-day Marin County, California
 Rancho San Geronimo (Villavicencio), a Mexican land grant in present-day San Luis Obispo County, California

People
 Geronimo (martyr), an Arab Catholic saint

See also
 San Jerónimo (disambiguation)